is a Japanese photographer.

Notes 

Japanese photographers
1947 births
Living people
Tokyo College of Photography alumni